Woja Airport  is a public use airstrip at Woja on Ailinglaplap Atoll, Marshall Islands. This airstrip is assigned the location identifier WJA by the IATA.

Airlines and destinations

References

Airports in the Marshall Islands